Garden Court is a neighborhood in the West Philadelphia section of Philadelphia, Pennsylvania. It is located west of Spruce Hill, north of Cedar Park, east of Cobbs Creek, and south of Walnut Hill.

In the 1920s, The Philadelphia Inquirer called Garden Court "the most exclusive location in West Philadelphia." Garden Court was placed on the National Register of Historic Places on July 5, 1984. The neighborhood contains a diverse mix of housing types, including the 116-unit Garden Court Condominiums. It is a racially mixed neighborhood. Income and property values are greater than those of West Philadelphia as a whole.

The neighborhood is mostly residential, but contains small rows of shops around the intersections of 48th and Spruce, and 47th and Pine.

Breadth: East to 46th Street, west to 52nd Street, north to Locust Street, south to Cedar Ave

References

External links

 Garden Court Historic District
 A History of Garden Court
 Garden Court Community Garden
 https://web.archive.org/web/20061231013824/http://westphillydata.library.upenn.edu/infoR_Neigh_GrdnCourt.htm
 Historic Photographs of Garden Court, PhillyHistory.org

Neighborhoods in Philadelphia
National Register of Historic Places in Philadelphia
Houses on the National Register of Historic Places in Pennsylvania
Historic districts in Philadelphia
University City, Philadelphia
Houses in Philadelphia
Historic districts on the National Register of Historic Places in Pennsylvania